Olı Ursaq is a rural locality (a selo) in Qaybıç District, Tatarstan. The population was 360 as of 2010.

Geography 
 is located 16 km east of Olı Qaybıç, district's administrative centre, and 109 km southwest of Qazan, republic's capital, by road.

History 
The village was established in the 18th century.

Until the first half of the 19th century village's residents belonged to the social estate of state peasants.

By the beginning of the twentieth century, village had 2 mosques, a Russian-Tatar school of the Ministry of National Education, a windmill, 2 watermills and 8 small shops.

Before the creation of the Tatar ASSR in 1920 was a part of Zöyä Uyezd of Qazan Governorate. Since 1920 was a part of Zöyä Canton; after the creation of districts in Tatar ASSR (Tatarstan) in Qaybıç (Ölçan in 1927) (1927–1959), Bua (1963–1964),  Apas (1964–1991) and Qaybıç districts.

References

External links 
 

Rural localities in Kaybitsky District